"Je ne suis là pour personne" is a song performed by the French pop singer Françoise Hardy. It first appeared on a 1966 Disques Vogue EP with another hit, "La maison où j’ai grandi", catalog number EPL 8427.

It was reissued on a BMG/Camden compilation album, Francoise Hardy, in 1999.

References

French-language songs
Françoise Hardy songs
1966 singles
1966 songs
Disques Vogue singles